is a Japanese light novel series written by Daisuke Aizawa and illustrated by Tōzai. It began serialization online in May 2018 on the user-generated novel publishing website Shōsetsuka ni Narō. It was later acquired by Enterbrain, who have published the series since November 2018.

A manga adaptation with art by Anri Sakano has been serialized in Kadokawa Shoten's seinen manga magazine Comp Ace since December 2018. A spin-off manga by Seta U titled  has also been serialized via Comp Ace since July 2019. Both the light novel and main manga have been licensed in North America by Yen Press. An anime television series adaptation produced by Nexus aired from October 2022 to February 2023. A second season has been announced.

Plot
A boy in modern-day Japan desires to be a mastermind who exerts power from the shadows, but in the process of training, gets hit by a truck and dies. He is reborn in a fantasy world as Cid Kagenou, where he maintains a perfectly mediocre appearance as to not stand out and pursue his dream of manipulating from the shadows. One day, he stumbles upon an elven girl infected by a mysterious disease and cures her. Cid makes up a story, explaining this world is secretly run by the Cult of Diablos, and his secret organization, "Shadow Garden", are the only ones that can fight them. The elven girl, now named Alpha, joins this organization and begins recruiting new members. However, the stories Cid made up were actually true, but he believes it to be total delusion. Cid continues fighting the Cult of Diablos under the alias "Shadow", completely unaware that he is involved in a complicated power struggle.

Characters

Main characters
 /  /  /  / 

Kageno is the main protagonist and a high-school student who dedicated himself into becoming stronger than a nuclear bomb. However after an accident where he was hit by a truck, he was reincarnated into another world where magic exists. He desires to act like a 'mob' character and blend into the background, but he has chūnibyō tendencies, basing all his actions on whatever he believes would look coolest. 

Cid's older sister, a skilled spellsword. She thinks herself as stronger than Cid and pushes him around, often acting aggressively towards him in the form of punching him and other forms of bodily harm when she finds herself annoyed by him. However, she does care about him to an obsessive degree, acting quite recklessly when she thinks her brother might be threatened. She later absorbs Diablos and becomes its host, but Cid thinks she is role-playing. 

A haughty princess, she makes it her job to make Cid's life as annoying as possible. She and Cid previously dated as an act, but she developed genuine feelings for him while he was eager to end their relationship. Also, she is one of the only characters to have personally seen "Shadow" in action (outside of Shadow Garden members) but does not know that Shadow's true identity is Cid himself.

Alexia's older sister. She built up a circle of soldiers, independent of the Knights, to fight anybody who threatens the peace, be it Shadow Garden or the Cult.

The princess of the neighbouring kingdom of Oriana, a country known for its art. She controversially took up the sword instead of traditional arts and became a transfer student at the Midgard Spellsword academy. She became the student council president and her swordsmanship at the academy was considered only second to the first princess of Midgar, Iris Midgar. She becomes known as "666" in later volumes of the light novel when she joins Shadow Garden after a series of events.

Shadow Garden

Seven Shades

The first member 7 Shades of Shadow Garden, those who receive magic power infusion directly from Shadow himself, with appearance as a beautiful elven girl which resemble the Hero from the past as well as her aunt, Beatrix the Goddess of War. When Cid first encountered her, she was suffering from Demon possession and was hardly recognizable as a human being. Cid experimented on her and inadvertently found a cure for Demon possession, in return for curing her she swore fealty to him becoming his second-in-command. She went on to find and recruit the other 6 main members of Shadow Garden and leads them in their pursuit of the Cult of Diablos.

The second member of Shadow Garden, she was the first member to be found by Alpha instead of Cid. An elf known for her natural beauty and ample chest. She writes 'the war chronicles of Shadow-sama', in which she details the exploits of Cid in his Shadow persona. She became a world-famous author named Natsume Kafka by publishing the stories Cid would tell her, which include popular media like Spirited Away and Spider-Man. Being a Jack of All Trades, she is given the positions of Operations Coordinator and Head of Mission Logistics in Shadow Garden.

The third member of Shadow Garden, though she is weak both physically and in technique, she possesses great intelligence. She is responsible for the creation and daily operations of Mitsugoshi Company, the front organization that funds Shadow Garden. Cid originally told her about concepts and products from his original world in the form of his "Shadow Knowledge" which Gamma was eventually able to recreate and sell for great profits. Nicknamed "the Brain" by Cid. Her public persona is president of Mitsugoshi company. Her immense intelligence and master diplomacy granted her the position of Head of Finance and Administration in Shadow Garden.

The fourth member of Shadow Garden, a dog beast-kin girl that is extremely strong and violent, but rather unintelligent. Due to her beast-kin nature, she also has heightened senses, such as being able to recognize scents from great distances and uses these to find and hunt her targets. She only listens to those stronger than her, and has only acknowledged Alpha and Cid as stronger than her. Also called "the Glass Cannon" by Cid. Many members consider her Shadow Garden's main fighting force due to her ferocity and ruthlessness in battle.

The fifth member of Shadow Garden, an elven girl with a haughty attitude. She is skilled in the use of the slime bodysuits worn by the organization's members, using it to make her seem tall and busty due to her being insecure about her short and slender figure. She is renowned as a world-famous pianist that popularized the Moonlight Sonata, taught to her by Cid. She's nicknamed the "Precise" among all Shadow Gardens members.

The sixth member of Shadow Garden, a cat beast-kin who is in charge of the organization's recon, travelling the world in search of new sights and products. She does not get along with Delta very well. She is a descendant of the legendary "Beastkin Hero" Lili. Her hatred of the Cult of Diablos is so great that she goes to extreme and radical measures to destroy them no matter the cost which puts her in odds with Alpha. Due to her disapproval of Alpha's leadership, she secretly created a sub-branch within Shadow Garden that is solely loyal to her alone. Her true goal is to make Shadow immortal and make him god of the new world to ensure the Cult of Diablos would not return.

The seventh and final member of the original Shadow Garden, the organization's head scientist. She has sleeping problems, tending to suddenly collapse at any moment.

Numbers
 (#13)

After the first 7 members of Shadow Garden (those recruited by Cid himself) come the 'numbers'. Nu is the first of the numbers to be featured, a formerly noble girl cast aside when she contracted Demon possession. She was later saved and initiated by one of the Seven Shadows into the Shadow Garden. She is highly skilled at make-up and disguises. Utilizing specially treated slime to mimic skin and shaping it to its desired form.

Others

A researcher studying in the academy, and adopted daughter of Vice Principal Ruslan. Her mother died after she discovered an ugly truth, and was adopted by Ruslan. After he died, she left the academy to study more.

One of Cid's fellow low-level students.

Another of Cid's fellow low-level students.

Media

Light novel
The series is written by Daisuke Aizawa and illustrated by Tōzai. It began serialization online in May 2018 on the user-generated novel publishing website Shōsetsuka ni Narō. It was acquired by Enterbrain in November 2018, who have published five volumes. Yen Press licensed the series for English publication.

Manga
A manga adaptation with art by Anri Sakano has been serialized in Kadokawa Shoten's seinen manga magazine Comp Ace since December 2018 and has been collected in ten tankōbon volumes. Yen Press also licensed the manga adaptation.

A spin-off manga by Seta U titled  has also been serialized via Comp Ace since July 2019. It has been collected in four tankōbon volumes.

Anime
An anime television series adaptation was announced on the fourth volume of the light novel on February 26, 2021. The series is produced by Nexus and directed by Kazuya Nakanishi, with scripts written by Kanichi Katou, character designs by Makoto Iino, and music composed by Kenichiro Suehiro. It aired from October 5, 2022, to February 15, 2023, on AT-X and other networks. The opening theme song is "HIGHEST" by OxT, while the ending theme song is "Darling in the Night" by Asami Seto, Inori Minase, Suzuko Mimori, Fairouz Ai, Hisako Kanemoto, Ayaka Asai, and Reina Kondō. Sentai Filmworks licensed the series for a North American release, and HIDIVE will be streaming it.

A second season was announced during a livestream on February 22, 2023. The main staff are returning from the previous season.

Reception
By October 2022, the series had a cumulative total of 2 million copies in circulation; over 3.5 million copies in circulation by December 2022; and over 4 million copies in circulation by February 2023.

The first Blu-ray volume sold 2,327 copies in its first week of debut; the second volume sold 2,499 copies in its first week.

Video games
An RPG mobile game developed by Aiming, titled  was released for iOS, Android, and PC on November 29, 2022. 	Crunchyroll Games launched the game worldwide on iOS and Android on the same day.

See also
 Saving 80,000 Gold in Another World for My Retirement, another light novel series illustrated by Tōzai

References

External links
  at Shōsetsuka ni Narō 
  
  
 
  at Crunchyroll Games, LLC

2018 Japanese novels
2022 anime television series debuts
Anime and manga based on light novels
Dark fantasy anime and manga
Enterbrain
Fiction about reincarnation
Isekai anime and manga
Isekai novels and light novels
Kadokawa Dwango franchises
Kadokawa Shoten manga
Light novels
Light novels first published online
Nexus (animation studio)
Seinen manga
Sentai Filmworks
Shōsetsuka ni Narō
Upcoming anime television series
Yen Press titles